Geekcorps is a non-profit organization that sends people with technical skills to developing countries to assist in computer infrastructure development.

The non-profit was created in 2000 by Ethan Zuckerman and Elisa Korentayer in North Adams, Massachusetts.  In 2001 Geekcorps became a division of the International Executive Service Corps located in Washington, D.C.

Creation 
After a visit to a Ghana library by Zuckerman in 1993, the lack of up-to-date resources available prompted him to create Geekcorps years later. Humanitarian and banker Elisa Korentayer became co-founder of Geekcorps due to the organization's need of financial wisdom. In effort to increase access to current information and bridge the digital divide in developing nations Zuckerman, and associates from his now bought out internet company tripod, funded most of the $350,000 budget for Geekcorps' first year.

Major projects

Ghana 
Starting September 2000, with 6 volunteers selected from over 200 applicants, Geekcorps first mission was in Accra, Ghana. Co-founder Zuckerman was already familiar with the infrastructure of Ghana. Zuckerman stated, "The government has relatively liberal telecommunications and investment policies, making it possible for IT businesses to be built there." Geekcorps initial focus in Ghana was assisting companies in the capital city Accra with its IT expertise. Geekcorps had an understanding with local businesses, after receiving help, the businesses involved were to help the locals with their newfound resources. Initial challenges for Geekcorps were communication and teaching skills needed by volunteers, and reliance on outdated programming languages for local businesses. Geekcorps involvement led to innovations such as a new java based payment system for local businesses in Ghana. Geekcorps was also instrumental in the creation of Ghana's internet exchange point in 2005.

Mali 
Initial assistance in Mali came from the CMRT (Community Mobilization through Radio Technology) program sponsored by USAID. Under CMRT, Geekcorps installed 5 radio stations to enable local communication through the area. Later under another program Radio for Peace Building, Geekcorps installed another 11 stations, and renovations were done to older existing stations.

Geekcorps set up ICT stations in less populated areas of Mali in 2006. These stations were updated by a memory stick delivered from a computer center with internet access in Ouelessebougou. Although this allowed many rural locations access to specific web resources, such as web pages and digital media, due to lack of interest the program was modified after a year. Yearly updates to more desired information such as Moulin, a French version of Wikipedia, became the focus.

Intel partnership and OLPC astroturf controversy
In 2007 Geekcorps Director Wayan Vota was accused of disparaging the OLPC project through a "OLPC News" website without disclosing Geekcorps' promotion of Intel's rival laptop, the Classmate PC and Microsoft's Windows XP.

See also
 eCorps
 Geeks Without Bounds
 ICVolunteers
 Inveneo
One Laptop per Child
NetCorps
 NetDay
 Random Hacks of Kindness 
United Nations Information Technology Service

References

External links
Geekcorps' Website (French version available)

Organizations established in 2000
Non-profit organizations based in Washington, D.C.
Information and communication technologies for development
International volunteer organizations
Digital divide
Charities
Charities
2000 establishments in Massachusetts